Roger Hussey may refer to:

Roger Hussey, see International Organization of Supreme Audit Institutions 
Roger Hussey (MP), for Sussex (UK Parliament constituency)